Hadean zircon is the oldest-surviving crustal material from the Earth's earliest geological time period, the Hadean eon, about 4 billion years ago. Zircon is a mineral that is commonly used for radiometric dating because it is highly resistant to chemical changes and appears in the form of small crystals or grains in most igneous and metamorphic host rocks.

Hadean zircon has very low abundance around the globe because of recycling of material by plate tectonics. When the rock at the surface is buried deep in the Earth it is heated and can recrystallise or melt. In the Jack Hills, Australia, scientists obtained a relatively comprehensive record of Hadean zircon crystals in contrast to other locations. The Jack Hills zircons are found in metamorphosed sediments that were initially deposited around 3 billion years ago, or during the Archean Eon. However, the zircon crystals there are older than the rocks that contain them. Many investigations have been carried out to find the absolute age and properties of zircon, for example the isotope ratios, mineral inclusions, and geochemistry of zircon. The characteristics of Hadean zircons show early Earth history and the mechanism of Earth's processes in the past. Based on the properties of these zircon crystals, many different geological models were proposed.

Background

Importance

Deeper understanding of Earth history 
The geological history of the Hadean eon of early earth is poorly known due to the lack of rock record older than 4.02 Ga (giga-annum or billion years). Most scientists accept that the plate recycling mechanism has melted almost all pieces of Earth's crust. However, some tiny parts of the crust have not been melted, as some rare Hadean zircon grains included in much younger host rock were discovered. The examination of Hadean detrital or inherited grains of zircon can give evidence of geophysical conditions of the early earth.

Scientific contribution 
Since there is no strong evidence depicting the early Earth's true environment, many models are generated to explain early Earth history. The high value of Hadean heat production and impact flux proved that continental crust did not exist, which is very different from the modern process. In the absence of large amount of undistributed data and within the constraints of analytical methods, calculation on geophysics and planetary science has been rapidly developed to explore this new area of knowledge.

Abundance 
Less than 1% of zircons detected around the world are over four billion years old. The probability of discovering at least a single over four billion-year-old zircon is very low. The abundance of over four billion-year-old zircon in the Jack Hills is anomalously high for most Archean quartzites and thus abundances probabilities of other spots are extremely low (0.2–0.02%).

By adopting uranium-lead dating (U-Pb) together with other analytical methods, more geochemical information can be obtained. Only 3% out of over 200,000 detrital zircon grains dated by U-Pb analysis are over four billion years old.

Types 
Due to different content of uranium and trace element concentration, four clusters of zircons are identified as below 
 Lunar and meteorite zircon
 Detrital grains zircon
 Kimberlite zircon
 Ocean crust zircon
Low crystallisation temperatures and trace element characteristics are the two major characteristics that differentiate mantle derived zircon or oceanic crust-derived zircon. Lunar and meteoritic zircons are unique because of their REE signature for example, lack of a cerium anomaly. The crystallization temperature ranges from 900 to 1100 °C. In contrast, terrestrial Hadean zircons are restricted to 600 to 780 °C. Hadean Jack Hills zircon has a wide range of oxygen fraction comparing to meteoritic zircons. No extraterrestrial zircons were found in any terrestrial locality. The textural characteristics like the growth zoning and inclusion mineralogy shows that Hadean zircon from the Jack Hills all come from igneous sources.

Properties 

The unspecified samples used for analyses below were Jack Hills zircon in Australia because of the high abundances and data available.

Age distribution 
U-Pb dating in the U-Pb zircon system has long been viewed as the crustal geochronometer because zircon is chemically resistant and enriched in U and Th compared to the daughter product Pb. Trace element and isotopic composition of zircon is important to determine the crystallisation environment.

Results from detrital zircons from the Erawondoo Hill discovery site conglomerate generally show the zircons to have a bimodal age distribution with major peaks at c. 3.4 and 4.1 Ga.

However, zircon is sensitive to radiation damage and can degrade into amorphous material. The Hadean zircon with original uranium concentrations greater than 600 ppm is challenged by the effect of post-crystallization alteration.

Isotope geochemistry 
Stable isotope data, indicating that the original host rocks to the zircon related to a significant amount of material formed on or near the Earth's surface and subsequently transferred to a middle- to lower-crustal level where they melted to generate the host magmas from which zircon crystallised.

Mineral inclusions 

The development of textural criteria for identifying primary inclusions opens up possibilities for recognising zircons' changing provenance with time and investigating their post-depositional alteration history. There are two common inclusion assemblages that are consistent with their forming in "I-type" (hornblende, quartz, biotite, plagioclase, apatite, ilmenite) and "S-type" (quartz, K-feldspar, muscovite, monazite) granitoids. Dominated by quartz with less abundant K-feldspar, plagioclase, muscovite, biotite, and phosphates, that are interpreted to have formed under relatively low geothermal gradient similar to that pertaining to modern subduction zones.

Zircon geochemistry 
By analysing the content of zircon, some zircon show the presence of titanium, rare earth minerals, lithium, aluminium and carbon. Certain ratio and normal distribution give evidence of zircon's origin and the source of magma.

Analytic method

Ion microprobe analysis 
Ion microprobe (or secondary ion mass spectrometry, SIMS) and uranium-thorium-lead geochronology are two common methods to measure isotope in specific time interval.

Highly precise in situ SIMS measurements of oxygen isotopes and OH/O ratios, laser-ablation inductively-coupled mass spectrometry (LA-ICP-MS) determination of hafnium isotopes, and atom-probe tomography. LA-ICP-MS is the most common method to date using isotopes but it lacks capacity to measure 204Pb. Therefore, there is a possibility that the occurrences of single zircons over 4 billion years old could be due to inclusion of non-radiogenic Pb.

U-Pb dating, delta 18O and Ti measurements can be tested by CAMECA ims 1270 ion microprobe. Epoxy are applied on the sample. A flat surface of sample is needed to conduct an analysis. U-Pb dating and T measurement uses a primary O− beam with low intensity (10-15 nA). U-Pb age standard AS3 was used for dating studies. The concentration of Ti can be determined based on analysis of Jack Hills zircon and NIST610 glass.

Electron microprobe analysis 

For inclusions investigation, JEOL 8600 electron microprobe analyzer (EPMA) were used to chemically analyze zircon. It is used to analyze the chemical composition of material. Electron beams are emitted to the mineral's surface and blow off ions and estimate the abundance of the elements within a very small sized sample. Many isotopes can be measured at once in this analysis for example Ti and Li.

Occurrence

Proposed mechanisms for forming Hadean Jack Hills zircons 

Plate tectonic theory is widely accepted for the generation of crust. With the Hadean rock record, most of the scientists concluded that the hypothesis of a hellish early Earth devoid of ocean is incorrect. Scientists have constructed different models to explain the thermal history in the early earth, such as the continental growth model, Icelandic rhyolites, intermediate igneous rocks, mafic igneous rocks, sagduction, impact melt, heat pipe tectonics, terrestrial KREEP and multi-stage scenarios.

The most famous one is continental growth model which is similar to the modern tectonic dynamics. 

Relatively low crystallisation temperature and some are enriched in heavy oxygen, contain inclusion similar to modern crustal processes and show evidence of silicate differentiation at ~4.5 Ga. Early terrestrial hydrosphere, early felsic crust in which granitoids were produced and later weathered under high water activity conditions and even the possible existence of plate boundary interactions.

References 

Zircon
Hadean